The Pristava House is a manor house in the foothills of the Karawanks Alpine range in the Municipality of Jesenice in northern Slovenia. It is a popular excursion point.

The house was built in 1641 or 1647 as a mountain chalet for the local ironworks-owning lower nobility and has recently been renovated. At the beginning of the 18th century the building belonged to Karl von Zois, a nobleman and Enlightenment botanist who established the second botanical park in Carniola at the site. The park still exists and features a variety of local and exotic trees.

The Pristava House features an inn, a restaurant, and an open-air dance-floor. The surrounding meadows are popular with picnickers, and are well known for their profusion of wild daffodils in the late springtime. Nearby Javornik Falls, a series of three waterfalls in the upper course of Javornik Creek, is a popular hiking destination. The house is accessible by road from the village of Koroška Bela or on foot via the Gajšek Trail.

References 

Municipality of Jesenice
Botanical gardens in Slovenia
Manors in Slovenia
Houses completed in 1647
1647 establishments in the Holy Roman Empire